Hans Knudsen is a canoer.

Hans Knudsen may also refer to:

Hans Knudsen (painter)
Hans Christian Knudsen (missionary)
Hans Christian Knudsen, Danish actor